The Liberia Football Association is the governing body of football in Liberia.  Its offices are located at Antoinette Tubman Stadium in Monrovia.

Clubs

Liberian First Division League (2022-2023). 
Mighty Barrolle FC
CeCe United
Nimba United FC
Nimba Kwado FC
Sandi FC
LISCR FC
LPRC Oilers
Freeport FC
IE
Watanga FC
Muscat FC
 Bea Mountain FC
 Jubilee FC
Heaven Eleven FC

2nd Division (2022-2023)
Almighty FC
Nimba FC
Since NPA FC
PAGS FC
Gardnersville FC
Paynesville FC
Margibi F C
Stages F C
Junior Professionals F C
Muscat F C
Tewor F C
Global Pharma FC
Life FC
Tony F C
National Port Authority (NPA) FC
 Black Man Warrior FC
 Angels FC

Women Football Division (2019-2020)
Blanco F C
Earth Angels F C
Determine Girls FC
World Girls F C
Hippo F C
Professionals Sisters F C
Senior Professionals F C
Island Queens F C
Ambassadors F C

External links
 Liberia Football Association
 Liberia at the FIFA website.
Liberia at CAF Online

Liberia
Sports governing bodies in Liberia
Football in Liberia
Sport in Monrovia
Sports organizations established in 1936
1930s establishments in Liberia